Mitsubishi Tanabe Pharma Corporation is a Japanese pharmaceuticals company from Osaka, a subsidiary of Mitsubishi Chemical Holdings Corporation.  was formed in 2001 from the merger of Mitsubishi-Tokyo Pharmaceuticals and Welfide Corporation.  On October 1, 2007 Tanabe Seiyaku Co., Ltd. merged with Mitsubishi Pharma to form Mitsubishi Tanabe Pharma.

Originally founded in 1678, Mitsubishi Tanabe considers itself as one of the oldest pharmaceutical companies in the world. Mitsubishi Tanabe Pharma is a member of the Mitsubishi UFJ Financial Group (MUFJ) keiretsu.

Products
Mitsubishi-Tanabe Pharmaceuticals developed the first BET inhibitor molecules.

In August 2014, the company announced three-year research collaboration agreement with AstraZeneca on diabetic nephropathy, to replace dialysis or kidney transplantation.

An intravenous treatment of Mitsubishi Tanabe is Radicava (edaravone) which has the goal to slow the decline of physical function in patients with amyotrophic lateral sclerosis (ALS) and was approved by the U.S. Food and Drug Administration in 2017. The U.S. American branch of Mitsubishi Tanabe created a locator for healthcare and infusion centers.

Mitsubishe Tanabe has also an orally disintegrating tablet for ALS with Exservan (riluzole).

Ownership history
In 1604, Tanabeya Matazaemon is granted a license by Tokugawa Ieyasu for trade in herbal medicines with Luzon and Siam.

In 1901, Motosaburo Tanabe, the Twelfth established a pharmacy in Tokyo, which incorporated in 1921 as Motosaburo Tanabe Shoten.

In 1921, Nippon Tar Industries was established.

In 1940, Takeda Kasei Co., Ltd. was established by Chobei Takeda & Co., Ltd. (present-day Takeda Pharmaceutical Company) and Nippon Kasei Chemical Co. Ltd. (present-day Mitsubishi Chemical Corporation) and built its first plant in Higashi-Yoshitomi-mura, Fukuoka Prefecture.

In 1943, Motosaburo Tanabe Shoten, changed its name to Tokyo Tanabe Pharmaceuticals Co., Ltd.

In 1946, Takeda Kasei Co., Ltd. changed its name to Yoshitomi Pharmaceutical Co., Ltd.

In 1949, Yoshitomi Pharmaceutical Co., Ltd. listed on Tokyo and Osaka stock exchanges.

In 1950, The Blood Plasma Corporation of Japan was established with head office and plant in Osaka. The founders included war criminals such as Kitano Masaji who performed torture and experimentations on humans in the Japanese military's notorious Unit 731 during World War II. These crimes were recognized by the UN as extreme "crimes against humanity".

In 1952, Nippon Tar Industries became Mitsubishi Chemical Industries, Ltd.

In 1964, Blood Plasma Corporation changed its name to Green Cross Corporation.

In 1998, Green Cross Corporation was acquired by Yoshitomi Pharmaceutical.

In 2000, Green Cross Corporation changing its name to Welfide Corporation.

In 1981, Mitsubishi Chemical Industries, Ltd. established a business alliance with Tokyo Tanabe Pharmaceuticals Co.

In 1984, Mitsubishi Chemical Industries, Ltd. changed its name to Mitsubishi Chemical Corporation following the  merger with Mitsubishi Petrochemical Co., Ltd.

In 1999, Mitsubishi Chemical Corporation and Tokyo Tanabe Pharmaceuticals Co. merged formally and formed Mitsubishi-Tokyo Pharmaceuticals, Inc., to take over the combined pharmaceutical operations of the two companies.

In 2001, Mitsubishi-Tokyo Pharmaceuticals and Welfide Corporation merged to establish Mitsubishi Pharma Corporation, and Mitsubishi Tanabe Pharma.

In October 2005, Mitsubishi Pharma Corporation  joined again with Mitsubishi Chemical Corporation to create Mitsubishi Chemical Holdings Corporation.

In July, 2017, Mitsubishi Tanabe Pharma acquired Neuroderm for $1.1 billion.

On 27 February 2020, Mitsubishi Tanabe Pharma was delisted from the Tokyo Stock Exchange, and is now described as a member of the Mitsubishi Chemical Holdings Group

References

External links
 Mitsubishi Tanabe Pharma 
  

Pharmaceutical companies of Japan
Companies based in Osaka Prefecture
Japanese companies established in 2007
Pharmaceutical companies established in 2007
Companies formerly listed on the Tokyo Stock Exchange
Life sciences industry
Mitsubishi companies
Midori-kai
Mitsubishi Chemical Holdings